Jillian Mele (born September 17, 1982) is an American news anchor and reporter who is best known for serving as co-host on Fox & Friends First from March 2017 to October 2021.  Starting in January 2022, she began reporting with WPVI-TV in Philadelphia. Starting in October 2022, she also began anchoring the Sunday night newscasts for WPVI-TV.

Biography
Mele was raised in Glenside, Pennsylvania, the daughter of Roseanne (née Zlemek) and Thomas Mele. She worked as a grocery store clerk in high school. In 2005, Mele graduated with a B.A. in arts and communication from La Salle University in Philadelphia. After school, she accepted a position as a sports anchor in Presque Isle, Maine and the WIVT-TV in Binghamton, New York. In 2007, she joined  NBC 10 in Philadelphia, where she earned an Emmy award for her work on a show about the Olympics.

In 2014, she accepted a position with NBC Sports Philadelphia where she co-hosted a morning sports talk show called Breakfast on Broad where she earned another Emmy and a Philadelphia Eagles post-game program called Endgame. In March 2017, Mele accepted a position at Fox News where she served as co-anchor of Fox & Friends First  and as headlines reporter for Fox & Friends until October 2021. On October 29, 2021, Mele announced that she would be leaving Fox News to return to La Salle University to pursue a Master's Degree. On her departure, Mele stated that "It's time to focus on my personal life." Mele is currently attending La Salle University.

In 2022, she accepted a position with WPVI-TV in Philadelphia.

See also
 New Yorkers in journalism
 List of La Salle University people

References

External links

1982 births
Living people
21st-century American women
American television reporters and correspondents
American television journalists
American women television journalists
Fox News people
Journalists from Pennsylvania
La Salle University alumni